Tirak (also Romanized as Tīraḵ) is a village in Abali Rural District, Rudehen District, Damavand County, Tehran Province, Iran. At the 2006 census, its population was 6, in 4 families.

References 

Populated places in Damavand County